The IZh-18 (ИЖ-18) is a single-shot, break-action shotgun.

History 
IZh-18 was designed in 1962-1963 as a successor to the IZhK, since 1964 began its serial production.

In November 1964, the price of one standard IZh-18 was 28 rubles.

Since January 1979 began the production of IZh-18E-20M and IZh-18-410M variants

In May 1981, the price of one standard IZh-18 was 22 rubles and 50 kopecks, the price of one standard IZh-18E was 37 rubles and 50 kopecks.

In 1985, the IZh-18EM shotgun was awarded the golden medal of the International Fair Plovdiv.

Since March 2018 ZAO "Техкрим" began to produce a detachable 520mm barrel ТК600 for IZh-18 shotguns. With TK600 barrel this gun can shoot .366 TKM cartridges.

Unknown number of IZh-18 shotguns were sold in foreign countries.

Design 
IZh-18 is a single-shot hammerless takedown shotgun.

The barrel is chrome-plated and has choke at the muzzle end. The detachable barrel is made from 50A steel (сталь 50A).

Soviet shotguns had a walnut, birch or beech stock and fore-end.

Variants 
 IZh-18 (ИЖ-18)
 IZh-18M (ИЖ-18М) - version of IZh-18, since January 1979
 IZh-18E (ИЖ-18Е), with automatic ejector
 IZh-18EM (ИЖ-18ЕМ) - version of IZh-18E, since early 1980s
 IZh-18E-20M (ИЖ-18Е-20М), export variant (IZh-18E chambered in 20/76 mm Magnum shotgun shells)
 IZh-18-410M (ИЖ-18-410М), export variant (IZh-18 chambered in .410/76 mm Magnum shotgun shells)
 IZh-18MK (ИЖ-18МК) - version of IZh-18M, since 1988
 IZh-18M-M (ИЖ-18М-M) - version of IZh-18M, since 1992
 IZh-18MN (ИЖ-18МН) - since 1994, single-shot rifle

Users 

  - 1600 IZh-18 shotguns were bought for zoological gardens, animal parks and wildlife sanctuaries of the Soviet Union as auxiliary firearm for employees. Also, these shotguns were allowed as civilian hunting weapon
  - they were on the territory of BSSR in Soviet times, now they are allowed as civilian hunting weapon
 
 
  - they were on the territory of Kazakh SSR in Soviet times, now they are allowed as civilian hunting weapon
  - they were on the territory of Latvian SSR in Soviet times, now they are allowed as civilian hunting weapon
  - they were on the territory of Moldavian SSR in Soviet times, now they are allowed as civilian hunting weapon
  - they were on the territory of RSFSR in Soviet times, now they are allowed as civilian hunting weapon
  - they were on the territory of Ukrainian SSR in Soviet times, now they are allowed as civilian hunting weapon
  - unknown number of shotguns were sold as civilian hunting weapon
  - European American Armory began importing IZh-18 shotguns from Russia in 1998. In January 2004, a contract was signed between the Remington Arms (Madison, North Carolina) and the Izhevsk Mechanical Plant. In 2005 Remington Arms began import of IZh-18 shotguns from Russia, they were marketed and distributed by Remington Arms as Remington Spartan 100 and IZh-18MN were sold as Remington SPR 18

Museum exhibits 
 one IZh-18EM-M shotgun is in collection of Tula State Arms Museum in Tula Kremlin

References

Sources 
 Охотничье одноствольное ружьё ИЖ-18 // Спортивно-охотничье оружие и патроны. Бухарест, "Внешторгиздат", 1965. стр.16-17
 Л. Е. Михайлов, Н. Л. Изметинский. Ижевские охотничьи ружья. 2-е изд., испр. и доп. Ижевск, изд-во «Удмуртия», 1982. стр.97-118
 ИЖ-18 // А. А. Потапов. Всё об охотничьих ружьях. М., ФАИР-Пресс, 2011. стр.342-343
 Виктор Рон. Нарезная "переломка" из Ижевска // журнал "Оружие", No. 15/16, 2017. стр.64 - ISSN 1728-9203

Single-shot shotguns of the Soviet Union
Single-shot shotguns of Russia
Izhevsk Mechanical Plant products